Citrivirus is a genus of viruses in the order Tymovirales, in the family Betaflexiviridae. Plants serve as natural hosts. There is only one species in this genus: Citrus leaf blotch virus.

Structure
Viruses in Citrivirus are non-enveloped, with flexuous and filamentous geometries. The diameter is around 12 nm, with a length of 960 nm. Genomes are linear, around 8.7kb in length. The genome has 3 open reading frames.

Life cycle
Viral replication is cytoplasmic. Entry into the host cell is achieved by penetration into the host cell. Replication follows the positive stranded RNA virus replication model. Positive stranded RNA virus transcription is the method of transcription. Plants serve as the natural host.

References

External links
 Viralzone: Citrivirus
 ICTV

Betaflexiviridae
Virus genera
Viral citrus diseases